Oshobe Oladele (born 25 November 1993) is a Nigerian footballer who currently plays as a midfielder for Hamitköy ŞK in Cyprus.

References

External links

Oshobe Oladele at KTFF

1993 births
Living people
Nigerian footballers
Nigerian expatriate footballers
FK Partizani Tirana players
PFC Lokomotiv Plovdiv players
FC Haskovo players
MFM F.C. players
Kategoria Superiore players
First Professional Football League (Bulgaria) players
Nigerian expatriate sportspeople in Albania
Expatriate footballers in Albania
Nigerian expatriate sportspeople in Bulgaria
Expatriate footballers in Bulgaria
Nigerian expatriate sportspeople in Cyprus
Expatriate footballers in Cyprus
Association football midfielders